Chadsmoor is an urban settlement within Cannock Chase District in the County of Staffordshire, England and lies between the wards of Cannock and Hednesford in South Staffordshire.

History 

In the 7th century St Chad, the patron Saint of Lichfield Cathedral, visited a Fosse or a deep broad ditch located near the Telecom tower (track from Pottal Pool to Pye Green) and stopped at a gate 400 m from the Pye Green junction. From then on the area to the south was called “Chads – Moor”. However, Cameron. points out that -kirk toponyms more frequently incorporate the name of the dedicatee, so it is not so certain that Chadsmoor was named after the saint.

Chadsmoor centre was basically developed around 1875 when the West Cannock Colliery Company built 3 collieries on adjacent land and the East Cannock Colliery Company quickly followed. Lord Hatherton then developed Littleton Colliery to the West. The need for houses for the miners and their families then became a priority and the population of Chadsmoor exploded.

In 1858 the South Staffordshire Railway built a rail line initially linking Birmingham to Walsall and then to Cannock, Hednesford and Rugeley and onwards to the Trent Valley Line (now the West Coast main Line) The present day “Chase Line”  still uses this route which goes through Chadsmoor. The stations at Hednesford & Cannock are just a short walk away. The “Chase Line” gives a regular service to the cities and towns to North and South.

By 1860 a large canal basin had been built on the Cannock Extension Line and this served as a base to move the produced coal direct to its sale areas such as Birmingham & London. The canal closed in 1965 and the old routes of the canal and associated tramways have been sympathetically landscaped.

In the First World War the miners of Chadsmoor made a substantial sacrifice for the country when more than 160 men lost their lives, many of them at the Somme, building tunnels under the German Lines, coincidentally doing the same work which they had left only weeks before. The Second World War saw a further 14 men lose their lives. The Chadsmoor History Society has in recent years built a Portland Stone memorial to commemorate all the names of the men who lost their lives. The stone was dedicated by the “Bishop of Wolverhampton” and the plaque by Major General John Henderson CB and this was funded by public subscription and small grants.

Geography 
Chadsmoor has an estimate area of 3.49 square kilometers and has an elevation of 170 meters above the sea level.

Climate 
Chadsmoor has a moderate, temperate climate; with average temperatures varying from 5 °C on winter to 18 °C on summer. See Penkridge weather station for details of average temperature and rainfall figures taken between 1981 and 2010 at the Met Office weather station in Penkridge.

Location 
The community comprises 2 wards (Cannock North & Cannock East). It is now, in 2017, a commuter area to the West Midlands Conurbation with a travel to work profile to the City of Wolverhampton (10 miles) and Birmingham (17 miles). The County town of Stafford is only 10 miles to the North and the City of Lichfield with its Three Spires Cathedral is 9 miles to the South.

Demography 
Chadsmoor, as of mid-2013 census, has a population of 14,410, distributed in 49.27% males and 50.73% females. Its population is older than the national mean (having averages of 40 and 39 respectively). As of 2011, its population, with 97.5% consisting of people born on the UK, was almost completely native

Notable Natives/Residents
Roland “Ronnie” Degg (1909-2001), DSO - Lieutenant Colonel South Staffs Regiment.
Tom Wakefield (1935-1996), Novelist. 
Stan Collymore (1971), Liverpool & England International Footballer.
Brian “Nobby” Horton (1949), Footballer and Premiership Manager.
Albert Stanley (1863-1915), MP. - Miners Leader – Member of Parliament.
Arthur Hopcraft (1932-2004), Author & Dramatist. 
Sydney Barnes (1873-1967), Cricketer.
Sir Steven Moss (1947), NHS Administrator. 
Malcolm Beard (1942), Birmingham Footballer.
Geoff Palmer (1954), Wolves Footballer.
Thomas "Tom" Galley (1915-2000), Wolves and England International Footballer

References

External links 
General Details - Chadsmoor Local History Society
Chadsmoor Methodist Church

Populated places in Staffordshire
Cannock Chase District